Miyakitamak (Miäkätamaq) is a rural locality (a selo) in Kozhay-Semyonovsky Selsoviet, Miyakinsky District, Bashkortostan, Russia. The population was 675 as of 2010. There are 5 streets.

Geography 
Miyakitamak is located 20 km north of Kirgiz-Miyaki (the district's administrative centre) by road. Starye Balgazy is the nearest rural locality.

References 

Rural localities in Miyakinsky District